Scoparia afghanorum is a moth in the family Crambidae. It was described by Patrice J.A. Leraut in 1985. It is found in Afghanistan and in the Chinese provinces of Shaanxi, Sichuan and Yunnan.

References

Moths described in 1985
Scorparia